Samuel Zauber (9 January 1901 Temesvár – 10 June 1986 Jerusalem) was a Romanian association football player who was on the Romania national football team for the first ever FIFA World Cup in 1930. Since 1964 he lived in Jerusalem, in Israel.

Playing career

Club 
Zauber played his club football for Jewish side, Maccabi București.

International 
Zauber was the back up goalkeeper for Romania at the 1930 FIFA World Cup in Uruguay. Afterwards, he represented Romania in the Balkan Cup.

Honours

Club
Maccabi București
Liga II (1): 1934–35

International
Romania
Balkan Cup (1): 1929–31

Footnotes

Sources
28 May 1992 כ"ה אייר תשנ"ב Reshumot Yalkut hapirsumim nr.4008 death date in Israel official monitor

External links 

1901 births
1986 deaths
Sportspeople from Timișoara
People from the Kingdom of Hungary
Austro-Hungarian Jews
Jewish footballers
Jewish Romanian sportspeople
Romanian footballers
1930 FIFA World Cup players
Romania international footballers
Liga II players
FC Sportul Studențesc București players
Maccabiah Games competitors for Romania
Maccabiah Games footballers
Maccabi București players
Association football goalkeepers